ARA San Martín was one of four  armored cruisers purchased by the Argentine Navy from Italy.

Design and description
She displaced  at normal load. The ship was powered by two vertical triple-expansion steam engines, each driving one shaft, using steam from eight Scotch marine boilers. Her complement consisted of 28 officers and 460 enlisted men.

Her main armament consisted of four 45-caliber Armstrong Whitworth  guns, in twin-gun turrets fore and aft of the superstructure. The ten 40-caliber quick-firing (QF)  guns that comprised her secondary armament were arranged in casemates amidships on the main deck. San Martín also had six QF  and six QF 6-pounder Hotchkiss guns to defend herself against torpedo boats. She was also equipped with four above-water  torpedo tubes, two on each side.

The ship's waterline armor belt had a maximum thickness of  amidships and tapered to  towards the ends of the ship. Between the main gun barbettes it covered the entire side of the ship up to the level of the upper deck. The barbettes, the conning tower, and gun turrets were also protected by 5.9-inch armor.

Construction and career
The ship was launched on 25 May 1896 and was stricken from the Navy List on 18 December 1935.

Notes

Footnotes

References 

 
 

 

Garibaldi-class cruisers of the Argentine Navy
Ships built in Livorno
1896 ships